Dušan Mavec (born 23 October 1947) is a Slovenian equestrian. He competed in two events at the 1984 Summer Olympics.

References

External links
 

1947 births
Living people
Slovenian male equestrians
Slovenian dressage riders
Olympic equestrians of Yugoslavia
Equestrians at the 1984 Summer Olympics
People from Sežana